Christoph Rudolff (born 1499 in Jawor, Silesia, died 1545 in Vienna) was the author of the first German textbook on algebra.

From 1517 to 1521, Rudolff was  a student of Henricus Grammateus (Schreyber from Erfurt) at the University of Vienna and was the author of a book computing, under the title:  (Nimble and beautiful calculation via the artful rules of algebra [which] are so commonly called "coss").

He introduced the radical symbol (√) for the square root. It is believed that this was because it resembled a lowercase "r" (for "radix"), though there is no direct evidence. Cajori only says that a "dot is the embryo of our present symbol for the square root" though it is "possible, perhaps probable" that Rudolff's later symbols are not dots but 'r's.

Furthermore, he used the meaningful definition that x0 = 1.

See also
 History of mathematical notation

Notes

References

External links
 Die Coss Christoffs Rudolffs

1499 births
1545 deaths
People from Jawor
16th-century German mathematicians
16th-century German writers
16th-century German male writers